Parson's Pond is a community in the province of Newfoundland and Labrador in Canada.

History
Parson's Pond was originally called Sandy Bay. It is located on the Great Northern Peninsula. The first census was in the late 19th century and had a population of just 18, by 2001 the population was 427.

Demographics 

Tourism
Parson's Pond, which has a small harbour, is on route 430 which is known as the Viking Trail. From the town there is a scenic view to Gros Morne National Park which is just 5 km to the south. The Arches Provincial Park with an interesting geological formation of limestone formed by glacial action, wind and water erosion is 10 km north of the town.

Parson's Pond is also known as the final resting place of Zachary Turner after being involved with a murder-suicide with his mother, Shirley Jane Turner.

References

External links 
Erosion in Parson's Pond
Oil excavation
Parson's Pond - Encyclopedia of Newfoundland and Labrador, vol. 4, p. 223. 

Towns in Newfoundland and Labrador